Photobox is an online photo printing company, founded in 2000 by Graham Hobson.

Photobox has two offices, one in London and one in Paris, and operates in 10+ countries, predominantly in Europe.

Business
In January 2000, Graham Hobson founded Photobox with his friend, Mark Chapman. In 2006 the company merged with French counterpart, Photoways. Stan Laurent became its head.
In 2007, Photobox officially launched a dedicated German website. In 2010 Photobox launched in Norway and Poland.

In July 2011, personalised card company Moonpig was acquired, creating the Photobox Group. This owns five brands: Photobox, Hofmann, posterXXL, Moonpig and Greetz.

References

Photography websites
Digital photography
Photography companies of the United Kingdom
Internet properties established in 2000